Peigan Timber Limit 147B is an Indian reserve of the Piikani Nation in Alberta, located within the Municipal District of Willow Creek No. 26.

References

Indian reserves in Alberta
Piikani Nation